Huddinge Municipality is a municipality in Stockholm County, east central Sweden. Its seat is located in Huddinge, which is a part of Stockholm urban area.

The municipality is, with its approximately 110,000 inhabitants, the second most populated in Stockholm County.

Geography
The municipality covers the entire central part of the Södertörn peninsula. More than half of the land area consists of agriculture, forests, hills, or lakes, and it contains 13 nature reserves.

Huddinge borders the following municipalities: Stockholm Municipality, Ekerö Municipality (by water), Botkyrka Municipality, Haninge Municipality and Tyresö Municipality (by water).

Localities

Stockholm urban area (part of) 86,802 inh.
Vidja 633 inh.
Rural areas 2,465 inh.

Subdivisions
Huddinge municipality is sub-divided into six districts: 
 Flemingsberg (pop. 14,924)
 Segeltorp (pop. 11,870)
 Sjödalen-Fullersta (pop. 22,304)
 Skogås (pop. 13,783)
 Stuvsta-Snättringe (pop. 15,847)
 Trångsund (pop. 9,912)
 Vårby (pop. 10,115), including Masmo

There are four territorial parishes of the Church of Sweden within the municipality: Huddinge, Trångsund, Flemingsberg and St. Mikael.

Natural reserves 
 Björksättra Peninsula Nature Reserve
 Drevviken Nature Reserve
 Flemingsbergsskogen Nature Reserve
 Gladö Kvarnsjön Nature Reserve
 Gladöskogen Nature Reserve
 Gömmaren Nature Reserve, including the Fullersta kvarn Natura 2000 area.
 Gömsta Äng Nature Reserve
 Korpberget Nature Reserve
 Lissmadalen Nature Reserve
 Lännaskogen Nature Reserve, including Lissma-Kvarnsjö and Lännaskogen Natura 2000 areas.
 Orlången Nature Reserve
 Paradiset Nature Reserve, including Granby and Hanveden Natura 2000 areas.
 Trångsundsskogen Nature Reserve

Lakes

History
It is believed that the history of Huddinge goes back at least 1,000 years, to before the Viking Age. When hostile ships approached the community, the inhabitants of Huddinge would climb to high locations and light beacons. Beacons were located around the entirety of Lake Mälaren. Huddinge's coat of arms has its origins in this tradition. The name Huddinge is believed to come from the Uddung's - the first inhabitants in this area, which during the Iron Age lived on the shores of Lake Mälaren nearby Vårby.

Split into two municipalities
After years of protests from inhabitants and after much debate, it was decided in 2007 to hold a vote in 2008 regarding a split to make the eastern part of Huddinge its own municipality, named in published documents as Huddinge östra ("Huddinge East"). However only the inhabitants of eastern Huddinge would be allowed to vote. This caused a major political split of opinions as the political opposition wanted to see a vote. At least 60% of the inhabitants of eastern Huddinge had to vote "yes" for the split for it to be approved.

The referendum ended with a clear "no" to the split, ending the discussion.

Demography
Huddinge has a total population of roughly 110,000, or 4.5% of the population of Stockholm County. The average age is 36.7 years, but one-third of the population is under 25 years of age. This means that Huddinge has a slightly younger population than both Stockholm County (38.9 years) and the whole country (40.6 years). The population density of the municipality is increasing significantly. Since the 1960s, the population has doubled in size and is currently among the 14 largest municipalities in Sweden. The population of Huddinge passed the one of Gävle in 2008, and the ones of Eskilstuna and Sundsvall as well in 2009.

Residents with a foreign background 
On 31 December 2017, the number of people with a foreign background (persons born outside Sweden or with two parents born abroad) was 43,699, or 39.73% of the population (110,003 on 31 December 2017). On 31 December 2002, the number of residents with a foreign background was (per the same definition) 24,319, or 28.13% of the population (86,457 on 31 December 2002). On 31 December 2017, there were 110,003 residents in Huddinge, of which 32,190 people (29.26%) were born in a country other than Sweden. Divided by country in the table below - the Nordic countries as well as the 12 most common countries of birth outside Sweden for Swedish residents have been included, with other countries of birth bundled together by continent by Statistics Sweden.

Schools 
In 2012 there were 27 public schools and five independent schools. Huddinge also has five public high schools with about 3400 students combined, these are:

 Huddingegymnasiet
 Östra Gymnasiet
 Sjödalsgymnasiet
 Sågbäcksgymnasiet
 Widerströmska gymnasiet

Public transport

Huddinge is served by the Stockholm public transport system. There are two stations on the Stockholm Metro and five on the Stockholm commuter rail system as well as large bus network. Some main line trains call at Flemingsberg.

2018 Election
Elections to Swedish municipalities are held every fourth year on the second Sunday in September. The 2018 election to the 61-seat council resulted in the centre-right Alliance of four parties (M, L, KD and C) plus two local parties (HP and DP) staying in power without a majority. The Alliance and local parties gained a seat since the 2014 election and maintains power. The three Red-Green parties (S, MP and V) are in opposition and the far right Sweden Democrats (SD) holds the balance of power but normally votes with the Alliance.

Culture
The municipality contains six public libraries, Södertörn University College and one of the campuses for Karolinska Institutet.

Kungens Kurva is one of Sweden's largest shopping areas. It hosts, among other things, the largest IKEA store in the world, the largest cinema in the country, and a large shopping centre. In total, it generates a turnover of 6 billion Swedish kronor and has 15 million visitors per year.
Mikael Akerfeldt from Opeth grew up in Huddinge.

Sports
The most known sports club in Huddinge is the ice hockey club Huddinge IK, which has fostered a long line of well-known Swedish ice hockey players, such as Michael Nylander, Mattias Norström and Kent Johansson, and used to be a regular runner up in the Swedish second division and the qualifications for the Elitserien. Peter Forsberg also happened to make his debut as a senior player with his original club Modo Hockey, facing Huddinge away.

Twin cities
 Lyngby-Taarbæk Municipality, Denmark
  Vantaa, Finland
 Nuuk, Greenland
 Seyðisfjörður, Iceland
 Askim, Norway

Notes

References

External links

Huddinge Municipality - Official site

Municipalities of Stockholm County
Metropolitan Stockholm
Stockholm urban area
Municipal seats of Stockholm County
Swedish municipal seats
Populated places in Stockholm County